The Rotokawa Power Station is a geothermal power station owned and operated by Mercury Energy.  It is located approximately 10 km north east of Taupo in New Zealand.  The station uses a binary cycle manufactured by Ormat Industries.

In May 2008, work began on the nearby Nga Awa Purua Power Station.

Environmental aspects
Due to the high temperatures associated with the geothermal vent here, this locale is an occurrence of extremophile micro-organisms that can thrive on the high vent water temperature.

See also

Geothermal power in New Zealand
List of power stations in New Zealand

References 

Geothermal power stations in New Zealand
Taupō District
Buildings and structures in the Taupo District